Samar Choudhury (1929/1930 – 10 September 2001 in New Delhi) was a member of the Indian Parliament representing the Tripura West constituency of Tripura. He died 10 September 2001 at the age of 71. He was a member of the Tripura Legislative Assembly for five terms from 1972 to 1998 and was minister of Industries, Health, Labour and Animal Resource Development from 1986 to 1988 and Minister of Home Affairs and Revenue from 1993 to 1998 in  a Government of Tripura

References 

Tripura politicians
1930s births
2001 deaths
Communist Party of India (Marxist) politicians from Tripura
India MPs 1999–2004
India MPs 1998–1999
Lok Sabha members from Tripura
State cabinet ministers of Tripura
Tripura MLAs 1972–1977
Tripura MLAs 1977–1983
Tripura MLAs 1983–1988
Tripura MLAs 1988–1993
Tripura MLAs 1993–1998